KHF may refer to:
 Korea Handball Federation
 Kazakhstan Handball Federation
 Kansas Health Foundation
 Kevin Harvick Foundation
 Korea Hapkido Federation